Kangaroo Beach is an Australian animated television series for preschool children which debuted on ABC Kids on 25 January 2021. It was created by Tim Bain, who is also a writer with Charlotte Rose Hamlyn, Simon Dodd and Samantha Carroll. Producers are Celine Goetz and Isla Curtis, and executive producer is Patrick Egerton from Cheeky Little Media. It was commissioned by ABC Children's and is financed and consulting on water safety information will be Bruce ‘Hoppo’ Hopkins (Bondi Rescue) and Craig Riddington of Surf Educators International.

The series screens internationally on networks including Nick Jr. and Channel 5 (Milkshake!) in the United Kingdom, Mango TV in China and Discovery Kids in Latin America.

Characters
Four junior lifeguards, kangaroo Pounce, koala Frizzy Bearheart, wombat Neville and platypus Gemma are on their way to becoming heroes of Kangaroo Beach, under the guidance of grown-up lifeguards Bondi, Sandy and Big Trev.

The series stars the voices of Kitty Flanagan, Matt Hardie and Rupert Degas, and a cast of children playing the Kangaroo Beach cadets.

Main
 Bondi (voiced by Matt Hardie)
 Sandy (voiced by Kitty Flanagan)
 Big Trev (voiced by Rupert Degas)
 Frizzy Bearheart (voiced by Eliza Hynes)
 Gemma (voiced by Millie Egerton)
 Pounce (voiced by Harriet Hynes)
 Neville (voiced by Jerra Wright-Smith)

Recurring
 Lin (voiced by Jason Chong)
 Wei (voiced by Skye Wright-Smith)
 Phillipa (voiced by Sebastian Bain)
 Charlene (voiced by Michelle Doake)
 Shelley (voiced by Kate Murphy)

Awards 
Kangaroo Beach won the Animated Series Production of the Year at the Screen Producers Australia Awards 2022 and an Asian Academy Creative Award for Best Animated Series in 2022. It was nominated for an AACTA Award for Best Children's Series 2022.

Episodes

Season 1 (2021)

Season 2 (2023)

External links
 Kangaroo Beach website

References

2020s Australian animated television series
2021 Australian television series debuts
Australian Broadcasting Corporation original programming
Australian children's animated comedy television series
Australian computer-animated television series
Animated television series about children
Television series about kangaroos and wallabies
Television series about koalas